"My Love" is a song by American R&B singer Mary J. Blige from her 1992 debut album, What's the 411? The song was co-written by singer-songwriter Kenny Greene and Dave Hall, who served as the song's original producer.

Lyrics and composition
The lyrics discuss Mary J. Blige's relationship with her ex-lover, after his failed relationship with the woman he left Blige for he wants to come back and start over. This causes her to wonder "what you're gonna do without my love?"

Versions
The original version is featured on Blige's debut album. A Teddy Riley-produced remix of the song, featuring rapper Heavy D, was released a promotional single in 1994; this version is found on Blige's 1993 What's the 411? Remix album, in a longer form.

Chart performance
The song peaked at number 23 on the US Hot R&B/Hip-Hop Songs chart and at number 29 on the UK Singles Chart in 1994, becoming Blige's second single to reach the top 40 in the United Kingdom.

Track listings

U.S. Cassette single
 "My Love" (Hip Hop with Rap) – 3:56
 "My Love" (New Jack Jazz) – 6:15

U.S. Cassette Maxi single
 "My Love" (Hip Hop with Rap) – 3:56
 "My Love" (Street Mix 1) – 6:35
 "My Love" (New Jack Jazz) – 6:15
 "My Love" (TR and Mary Mix) – 4:02
 "My Love" (Acapella) – 3:52

U.K. Cassette single
 "My Love" (Radio Mix) – 3:56
 "My Love" (Album Version) – 4:14

U.K. CD single and U.K. 12" single – Version 1
 "My Love" (Radio Mix) – 3:56
 "My Love" (On Da Street) – 6:35
 "Reminisce" (Uno Clio Mix) – 6:14
 "Reminisce" (Sure is Pure Dub Two) – 7:16

U.K. 12" single – Version 2
 "My Love" (Album Version) – 4:14
 "Reminisce" (D&D Dub) – 6:20
 "Reminisce" (S.D.A. Dub) – 9:09
 "Reminisce" (Sure is Pure Dub One) – 6:36

Charts

Weekly charts

Year-end charts

Release history

References

Mary J. Blige songs
1992 songs
1994 singles
MCA Records singles
Song recordings produced by Dave Hall (record producer)
Song recordings produced by Teddy Riley
Songs written by Dave Hall (record producer)
Songs written by Kenny Greene
Uptown Records singles